The Crestar-Farm Fresh Classic was a golf tournament on the LPGA Tour from 1979 to 1992. It was played at three different courses in Hampton Roads area of Virginia.

Tournament locations

Winners
Crestar-Farm Fresh Classic
1992 Jennifer Wyatt
1991 Hollis Stacy

Crestar Classic
1990 Dottie Mochrie
1989 Juli Inkster
1988 Juli Inkster

United Virginia Bank Golf Classic
1987 Jody Rosenthal

United Virginia Bank Classic
1986 Muffin Spencer-Devlin
1985 Kathy Whitworth
1984 Amy Alcott
1983 Lenore Muraoka
1982 Sally Little
1981 Jan Stephenson
1980 Donna Caponi
1979 Amy Alcott

References

External links
Elizabeth Manor Golf & Country Club
Sleepy Hole Golf Course
Greenbrier Country Club

Former LPGA Tour events
Recurring sporting events established in 1979
Recurring sporting events disestablished in 1992
Golf in Virginia
Sports in Hampton Roads
1979 establishments in Virginia
1992 disestablishments in Virginia
History of women in Virginia